Snooze is an album by American pianist Joanne Brackeen recorded in 1975 and released on the Choice label before being rereleased as Six Ate on CD on Candid in 1996.

Reception 

AllMusic reviewer Scott Yanow stated "Pianist Joanne Brackeen's debut album (after a barely documented period with Art Blakey's Jazz Messengers) is a very impressive effort. ... Her chord voicings are thick and sometimes quite dense, but this music is strangely accessible".

Track listing
All compositions by Joanne Brackeen except where noted.
 "Nefertiti" (Wayne Shorter) – 7:56
 "Circles" (Miles Davis) – 7:19
 "C-Sri" – 6:07
 "Zulu" – 4:46
 "Sixate" – 4:49
 "Old Devil Moon" (Burton Lane, Yip Harburg) – 6:48
 "Snooze" – 6:24
 "I Didn't Know What Time It Was" (Richard Rodgers, Lorenz Hart) – 6:46 Bounus track on CD release

Personnel
Joanne Brackeen – piano
Cecil McBee – bass
Billy Hart – drums

References

Joanne Brackeen albums
1975 albums
Candid Records albums